A Flaming Doctor Pepper is a flaming cocktail with taste similar to the soft drink Dr Pepper, despite Dr Pepper not being one of its ingredients. It was invented at the Ptarmigan Club in Bryan, Texas (located near Texas A&M University).

Preparation
It is usually made by filling a shot glass with 3 parts Amaretto and 1 part high-proof liquor, such as Everclear or Bacardi 151. The two liquors are not mixed; the high-proof alcohol is layered on top of the Amaretto. The shot is then set on fire and dropped into a glass half-filled with beer. The flames are extinguished by the beer, and the cocktail should then be drunk quickly.

See also
 Bomb shot
 Cheeky Vimto
 Gold Mine Saloon
 Long Island iced tea
 Queen Mary (beer cocktail)
 Shooter (mixed drink)

References

External links 

Cocktails with rum
Cocktails with beer
Flaming drinks